In August 2022, an attack by suspected Islamists killed 42 Malian soldiers and injured 22 more. The attack was one of the deadliest attacks in recent years during the Mali War.

Background 
In 2012, Tuareg rebels launched a rebellion against the Malian government. After some initial success, hardline Islamist groups such as AQIM and ISWAP hijacked the rebellion and began an insurgency against the Malian government. Some of the worst affected regions throughout the war have been the southern provinces of Gao and Mopti. In early March 2022, rebels attacked Malian soldiers stationed in the area of Mondoro, killing 33 Malian soldiers and injuring 33 more.

Attack 

On August 7, around 3pm local time, alleged ISGS fighters launched an attack on Malian soldiers near Tessit with "drones, explosives, car bombs, and artillery" The Malian government released a statement claiming to have killed 37 fighters during the ensuring battle. Two of the civilians killed during the fighting were elected officials.

References

Mali War
Gao Region
2022 in Mali
Battles involving Mali
August 2022 events in Africa
Attacks in Africa in 2022